"Don't Leave Me Alone" is a song by French DJ and music producer David Guetta featuring English singer Anne-Marie. It was written by Noonie Bao, Sarah Aarons, Guetta and Lotus IV, with production handled by the latter two. The song was released through What a Music and Parlophone, as the fourth single from Guetta's seventh studio album, 7 (2018). "Don't Leave Me Alone" is included on the deluxe edition of Anne-Marie's debut studio album, Speak Your Mind.

Critical reception
Writing for Grammy.com, Philip Merrill gave the song a positive review: "Touching and simple, this dance-jam prayer to stick together has a strong, independent outlook."

Track listing

Digital download
"Don't Leave Me Alone" – 3:03

Digital download – Acoustic
"Don't Leave Me Alone" (Acoustic) – 3:08

Digital download – EDX's Indian Summer Remix
"Don't Leave Me Alone" (EDX's Indian Summer Remix) – 3:30
"Don't Leave Me Alone" (EDX's Indian Summer Extended Mix) – 5:05

Digital download – Oliver Heldens Remix
"Don't Leave Me Alone" (Oliver Heldens Remix) – 3:24

Digital download – Remixes EP
"Don't Leave Me Alone" (R3hab Remix) (Radio Edit) – 3:02
"Don't Leave Me Alone" (David Guetta Remix) – 4:58
"Don't Leave Me Alone" (Sidney Samson Remix) – 4:31
"Don't Leave Me Alone" (Tom Staar Remix) – 3:51

Charts

Weekly charts

Year-end charts

Certifications

Release history

References

2018 singles
2017 songs
David Guetta songs
Anne-Marie (singer) songs
Songs written by David Guetta
Songs written by Noonie Bao
Songs written by Sarah Aarons
Songs written by Linus Wiklund
Song recordings produced by David Guetta